Two elections in Ireland took place in 1921, as a result of the Government of Ireland Act 1920 to establish the House of Commons of Northern Ireland and the House of Commons of Southern Ireland. The election was used by Irish Republicans as the basis of membership of the Second Dáil.

Where contested, the elections used single transferable vote. Multi-member districts were used electing from three to eight members in each district.

In the election to the area designated as Northern Ireland, 52 members were elected from 9 geographic constituencies and Queen's University of Belfast.

In the election to the area designated as Southern Ireland, 128 candidates, 124 of whom were members of Sinn Féin, were returned unopposed from 26 geographic constituencies and the National University constituency.

Southern Ireland result

No actual polling took place in Southern Ireland as all 128 candidates were returned unopposed. Of these, 124 were won by Sinn Féin and four by independent Unionists representing Dublin University (Trinity College). When the date of the elections was announced in the House of Commons, the Conservative MP Sir William Davison, who had been born in Broughshane, County Antrim, had asked "What is the object of holding elections in Southern Ireland when any candidates who do not support Sinn Fein would be shot?" Other members had replied "How do you know?"

John Dillon and T. P. O'Connor both agreed that the Irish Party should not fight Sinn Féin for seats for the Southern parliament as things stood. Former Irish Parliamentary Party MP Stephen Gwynn, now a member of the Irish Dominion League, advocated putting up League candidates against Sinn Féin. In early March he met with southern Unionists Viscount Midleton and Lord Oranmore, requesting them to pool their resources to contest the election and contest the election on a platform opposing the IRA's violence, under Midleton's leadership. Midleton declined the invitation, just as he had declined a previous request for his Unionist Anti-Partition League to join the Dominion League.

A single Unionist candidate had been selected to contest the constituency of Donegal: Major Robert L Moore, who had contested East Donegal in 1918. Moore however later withdrew his candidacy just before the election.

Only Sinn Féin candidates recognised the Dáil and five of these had been elected in two constituencies (Michael Collins, Éamon de Valera, Arthur Griffith, Seán Milroy and Eoin MacNeill) one in each part of Ireland. The total number of members who assembled in the Second Dáil was 125: 119 elected solely in Southern Ireland, 1 solely in Northern Ireland (Seán O'Mahony), and 5 in both.

In Southern Ireland, there were fresh elections in 1922 as a result of the Anglo-Irish Treaty.

Northern Ireland result

The general election to the Northern Ireland House of Commons occurred on Tuesday, 24 May. Of 52 seats, including Queen's University of Belfast, 40 were won by Unionists, 6 by moderate nationalists and 6 by Sinn Féin.

Voting summary

Seats summary

See also
Members of the 2nd Dáil
Government of the 2nd Dáil
1918 Irish general election

References

Ireland
Elections
 
Irish elections
1921
Ireland 1921
2nd Dáil
Irish elections
General